Argentine-Swedish are foreign relations between Argentina and Sweden. Both countries established diplomatic relations on January 3, 1846. Argentina has an embassy in Stockholm. Sweden has an embassy in Buenos Aires and 3 honorary consulates (in Córdoba, Oberá, and Tucumán); the ambassador is also concurrent to Uruguay and Paraguay.

There are around 175,000 people of Swedish descent living in Argentina.

In 1977, Swedish-Argentine girl Dagmar Hagelin disappeared in Argentina during the Dirty War.

See also 
 Foreign relations of Argentina
 Foreign relations of Sweden 
 Argentina–European Union relations
 Swedish Argentines
 Brazil–Sweden relations

References

External links 
  Argentina Ministry of Foreign Relations: list of bilateral treaties with Sweden (in Spanish only)
   Swedish embassy in Buenos Aires (in Spanish and Swedish only)

Sweden
Bilateral relations of Sweden